Paulo Francisco da Silva Porto known as Paulo Porto (born 27 September 1951 in Taquari) is a Brazilian professional football manager.

Titles
Esportivo
Copa FGF: 2004

Veranópolis
Campeonato Gaúcho do Interior: 2007

Inter de Santa Maria
Campeonato Gaúcho do Interior: 2008

Caxias
Taça Piratini: 2012

Pelotas
Copa Sul Fronteira: 2013
Super Copa Gaúcha: 2013
Recopa Gaúcha: 2014

References

External links
 Profile at Soccerway.com
 Profile at Soccerpunter.com

1951 births
Living people
Sportspeople from Rio Grande do Sul
Brazilian football managers
Grêmio Esportivo Glória managers
Esporte Clube Guarani managers
Clube Náutico Marcílio Dias managers
Clube Esportivo Bento Gonçalves managers
Grêmio Esportivo Brasil managers
Veranópolis Esporte Clube Recreativo e Cultural managers
Canoas Sport Club managers
Sociedade Esportiva e Recreativa Caxias do Sul managers
Esporte Clube Internacional managers
Clube Atlético Metropolitano managers
Futebol Clube Santa Cruz managers
Esporte Clube São Luiz managers
Sociedade Esportiva Recreativa e Cultural Brasil managers
Esporte Clube Novo Hamburgo managers
ABC Futebol Clube managers
Esporte Clube Pelotas managers
Clube Esportivo Aimoré managers
Esporte Clube Passo Fundo managers
Esporte Clube Internacional de Lages managers